Behavior Modification (BMO) is a peer-reviewed academic journal that presents insightful research, reports, and reviews on applied behavior modification. The editor is Alan S. Bellack (University of Maryland). It was established in 1977 and is currently published by SAGE Publications. This journal is a member of the Committee on Publication Ethics (COPE).

Abstracting and indexing 
Behavior Modification is abstracted and indexed in Scopus and the Social Sciences Citation Index. According to the Journal Citation Reports, its 2017 impact factor is 2.024, ranking it 60 out of 127 journals in the category "Psychology, Clinical".

References

External links 
 

SAGE Publishing academic journals
English-language journals
Clinical psychology journals
Publications established in 1977
Bimonthly journals
Behaviorism journals